The 2002 FIA Sportscar Championship Magny-Cours was the fourth race for the 2002 FIA Sportscar Championship season held at Circuit de Nevers Magny-Cours, France.  It took place on June 30, 2002.

Official results
Class winners in bold.  Cars failing to complete 75% of winner's distance marked as Not Classified (NC).

Statistics
 Pole Position - #8 Racing For Holland - 1:27.715
 Fastest Lap - #8 Racing For Holland - 1:29.780
 Distance - 403.750 km
 Average Speed - 161.497 km/h

External links
 Race results

M
FIA Sportscar
FIA Sportscar Championship Magny-Cours